Sam Jones (born April 29, 1978) is an American-Dutch professional basketball coach and former player who is an assistant coach for the Colorado State Rams. He was an assistant coach for the Cleveland Cavaliers of the National Basketball Association (NBA).

During his playing career, Jones played in Europe for several clubs as well as for the Netherlands national basketball team.

National team career
Jones started the process of obtaining a Dutch passport in 2017. He played 25 caps for the Netherlands national basketball team; he made his debut on August 14, 2008 against Sweden.

Coaching career
After being an assistant for EiffelTowers Den Bosch (now Heroes Den Bosch) under Austrian coach Raoul Korner for three seasons, Jones became head coach of the club in 2013. In the 2014–15 season, he won his first DBL title with Den Bosch, after his team beat Donar Groningen 4–1 in the Finals.

On September 27, 2016, Jones was hired by the Canton Charge to serve as an assistant coach.

On August 21, 2019, Jones was named as a player development coordinator of the Cleveland Cavaliers.

References

External links
Dutch Basketball League profile  
Jones' official website

1978 births
Living people
American emigrants to the Netherlands
American expatriate basketball people in Cyprus
American expatriate basketball people in the Netherlands
American men's basketball coaches
American men's basketball players
Apollon Limassol BC players
Aris Leeuwarden players
Basketball coaches from Illinois
Basketball players from Chicago
Canton Charge coaches
Heroes Den Bosch coaches
Heroes Den Bosch players
Dutch basketball coaches
Dutch Basketball League players
Dutch men's basketball players
Gent Hawks players
Keravnos B.C. players
Northwood Timberwolves men's basketball players
Point guards
Feyenoord Basketball players
Cleveland Cavaliers assistant coaches